Denise Anne Tepler (born May 15, 1956) is an American politician serving as a member of the Maine House of Representatives from the 54th district. Elected in November 2014, she assumed office on December 3, 2014.

Early life and education 
Tepler was born in Philadelphia in 1956. She earned a Bachelor of Arts degree in anthropology and a Master of Arts in cultural anthropology from the University of Pennsylvania. She also studied public policy at the University of Southern Maine.

Career 
From 1981 to 1983, Tepler worked as director of internal communication at the University of Arkansas at Little Rock. She was also a curatorial assistant at the Peary–MacMillan Arctic Museum. She later worked as a substitute teacher for the Brunswick School Department and as an adjunct professor at the University of Maine. From 2006 to 2008, she was a research assistant for the Maine Humanities Council. She was elected to the Maine House of Representatives in 2014. Since 2020, she has served as chair of the House Health Coverage, Insurance and Financial Services Committee.

References 

1956 births
Living people
Politicians from Philadelphia
University of Pennsylvania alumni
University of Southern Maine faculty
University of Maine faculty
Democratic Party members of the Maine House of Representatives
Women state legislators in Maine
People from Topsham, Maine